Ibrahim Shehu Shema (born 22 September 1957) is a Nigerian lawyer and politician who was elected Governor of the north western State of Katsina during the 2007 general elections. 
He was re-elected for another four-year term on 28 April 2011, running on the People's Democratic Party (PDP) platform. His second four-year term ended on 29 May 2015 after which he handed over to Aminu Bello Masari, elected governor on the platform of All Progressives Congress.

Background

Ibrahim Shema was born on 22 September 1957 at Dutsin-Ma town in Katsina State. He attended Nasarawa Primary School, Katsina (1964–1971) and Government Secondary School, Kafanchan (1972–1976). He studied at the College of Arts, Science & Technology, Zaria from 1977 to 1980, when he gained admission into Ahmadu Bello University, Zaria, graduating with an LLB in 1983. A year later, he obtained his B.L at the Nigeria Law School, Victoria Island, Lagos. While practicing law, he studied for a Master of Business Administration from Ahmadu Bello University, which he obtained in 1998.

Political career

Shema was the state Attorney General and Commissioner for Justice (August 1999 - May 2003) during Umaru Musa Yar'Adua's first term as Governor of Katsina State, after which he returned to his private legal practice in Kaduna.  In January 2005, he was appointed as a member of the People's Democratic Party (PDP) Special Committee on the Anambra Crisis.  He then served as the deputy national chairman (North-west zone) of the People's Democratic Party (September 2005 - November 2006),  At the same time, serving as Chairman of the PDP National Disciplinary Committee, and Chairman, Governing Council, Peoples Democratic Institute. Shema also served as Chairman, National Reconciliation Committee for the South-South PDP (May to June 2006). He also served as Chairman of the Governing Board of the Nigerian Airspace Management Agency (NAMA) from December 2005 to November 2006, when he won the PDP's ticket to contest the 2007 gubernatorial elections in Katsina State.

Governor of Katsina State

Ibrahim Shema was elected Governor of Katsina State on 12 April 2007, as successor to Umaru Yar'Adua, who had been elected president. He took office on 29 May 2007.
Shema has been described as a "stingy governor," for his refusal to open the State's vault for Katsina politicians, a characteristic he shares with his predecessor, Umaru Musa Yar'adua .

Shema was reelected for another four-year term on 28 April 2011, running on the People's Democratic Party (PDP) platform. Shema won 1,027,912 votes, followed by Masari of the Congress for Progressive Change (CPC) with 555,769 votes. The Action Congress of Nigeria (ACN) candidate came third with 19,990 votes.

Criticisms

See also
List of Governors of Katsina State

References

1943 births
Living people
Nigerian Muslims
Governors of Katsina State
People from Katsina State
Peoples Democratic Party state governors of Nigeria